Mottram in Longdendale is a village in Tameside, Greater Manchester, England. At the 2011 census, the population for the ward of Longdendale, which includes Mottram and the surrounding area, was 9,950.

Historically part of Cheshire, it lies in the valley of Longdendale, on the border with Derbyshire and the Peak District near Broadbottom and Hattersley. Mottram in Longdendale Parish was one of the eight ancient parishes of the Macclesfield Hundred of Cheshire. The larger Mottram parish was incorporated into Longdendale in 1936, remaining part of Cheshire, then incorporated into Tameside by the Local Government Act 1972 in 1974.

History
In 1795, Aikin in his book, Forty Miles around Manchester, wrote
Mottram is situated twelve miles from Manchester and seven for Stockport, on a high eminence one mile to the west of the Mersey, from which the river ground begins to rise; half the way being so steep as to make it difficult to access. It forms a long street well paved both in the town and some distance on the roads. It contains 127 houses, which are for the most part built of a thick flag stone, and covered with a thick, heavy slate, of nearly the same quality, no other covering being able to endure the strong blasts of wind which occasionally occur. Of late, many of the houses in the skirts of the town are built of brick. About fifty years ago, the houses were few in number, and principally situated on top of the hill, adjoining the churchyard, where is an ancient cross, and at a small distance the parsonage house, now gone much to decay and occupied by working people. It is only of late years that the town has had any considerable increase, which has been chiefly at the bottom of the hill, but some latterly on the top.
In the 18th century the River Etherow was known as the Mersey. The River Tame has been a border from the earliest times between the Anglo-Saxon kingdoms of Northumbria and Mercia. The ancient parish was the most northerly in Cheshire. Mottram came to prominence as a transport hub. It lies on two pack horse routes used to carry salt from Cheshire to South Yorkshire over the Pennines and carry lime for soil improvement from Chapel-en-le-Frith. It was on the Manchester to Sheffield stage coach route, and had a flyer service to Manchester. Before the Industrial Revolution Mottram and Ashton had been the most significant towns in the area, the manor and manorial court house were in Mottram, but other towns eclipsed Mottram in size and importance. Mottram was active in the early stages of industrialisation, and there were significant cotton spinning mills in Wedneshough Green and the Treacle Street areas of Mottram Moor, and printing and dyeing works on the Etherow at Broadbottom which until recently was part of the parish.

The smaller early mills in Mottram became uneconomic and harder to run. Stalling industrialisation led to social conflict and hunger during 1812 Luddite riots that led to the smashing of labour-reducing machines. The Luddites secretly drilled on Wedneshough Green. In 1842 local Chartists met on the green, and planned the closure of Stalybridge factories in the Plug Riots. By 1860 the population had peaked. The 1844 railway passed through the valley with stops at Hattersley and Broadbottom in the parish but not at the Mottram township.

A Polish pilot, Josef Gawkowski, was killed on 19 July 1942 when his aircraft crashed near Mottram on a training flight from RAF Newton in Nottinghamshire. A memorial plaque commemorating him is in Mottram Cemetery.

Geography

Mottram occupies an elevated site straddling the A57 trunk road from the end of the M67 to the junction with the A628 trunk road. The geology is mainly boulder clay above millstone grit, but there are small outcrops of coal at the edge of the Lancashire Coalfield. To the south and east of Mottram is the River Etherow and to the west is the Hurstclough Brook.

Longdendale bypass proposal

The A628 trunk road connects the M67 motorway from Manchester to the M1 motorway in South Yorkshire.  The road is single-carriageway through Mottram, Hollingworth and Tintwistle and through the Peak District National Park, it is used by large numbers of heavy goods vehicles.  It is one of the most congested A-road routes in the country, with high volumes of traffic (including HGVs) using a road which is totally unsuitable for the volume and nature of traffic it carries The A628 through Mottram carries traffic from the A57 road linking Manchester through Glossop to Sheffield over the Snake Pass, another major Trans-Pennine route. Congestion at peak times backs up through Glossop and Hadfield rendering local journeys impossible. To solve these problems the Longdendale Bypass was approved in December 2014, but has not yet been started. There is considerable local feeling that there is no viable alternative to a bypass.

Landmarks
St Michael and All Angels Church dates from the late 15th century. The church is a Grade II* Listed Building, built in the Perpendicular Gothic style. The interior of St. Michael's was remodelled in 1854 but the exterior remains intact from the 15th and 16th centuries. The church stands high up on Warhill overlooking the village. In 2010, vandals destroyed the church's windows which led to cork boards being used as replacements.

Mottram Old Hall is a country house in Old Hall Lane which dates to 1727 and was once occupied by the Hollingworth family.

Sport
Mottram Cricket Club plays in the Greater Manchester Cricket League. The club was founded in 1860.

Notable people
Sir Edmund Shaa was a goldsmith, and Lord Mayor of London in 1482, dying there 20 April 1488. He appeared as a character in William Shakespeare's play Richard III, and a bequest was used to found Stockport Grammar School.
Lawrence Earnshaw (c.1707–12 May 1767) was an inventor and machine-maker, who made an astronomical clock, and a machine to spin and reel cotton in one operation.

John Chapman (1810–1877) was MP for Grimsby, High Sheriff of Cheshire, JP and Chairman of the Manchester, Sheffield and Lincolnshire Railway. He lived in Broadbottom.
The Stretford-born artist L.S. Lowry lived in Mottram from 1948 until his death in 1976. A bronze statue of him seated on a bench is located next to the junction of Hyde Road and Stalybridge Road, and there is a commemorative plaque on his former home, "The Elms" on Stalybridge Road.

Famous former residents also include Kathy Staff (aka Nora Batty from the sitcom Last of the Summer Wine) and Harold Shipman, the UK's most prolific serial killer.

See also

Listed buildings in Longdendale
Mottram Tunnel

References

Bibliography
A Tameside bibliography Published by Tameside MBC

External links 

Mottram Cricket Club
Mottram in Longdendale
History of Mottram
Mottram Parish
Mottram War Memorial
Lawrence Earnshaw Memorial
L.S.Lowry
Air crash site

Geography of Tameside
Towns and villages of the Peak District
Villages in Greater Manchester